ARGUS (A Russian-German-United States-Swedish Collaboration; later joined by Canada and the former Yugoslavia) was a particle physics experiment that ran at the electron–positron collider ring DORIS II at the German national laboratory DESY. Its aim was to explore properties of charm and bottom quarks. Its construction started in 1979, the detector was commissioned in 1982 and operated until 1992.

The ARGUS detector was a hermetic detector with 90% coverage of the full solid angle. It had drift chambers, a time-of-flight system, an electromagnetic calorimeter and a muon chamber system.

It is the first experiment that observed the mixing of the B mesons into its antiparticle, the anti-B meson (in 1987). This observation led to the conclusion that the second-heaviest quark – the bottom quark – could under certain circumstances convert into a different, hitherto unknown quark, which had to have a huge mass. This quark, the top quark, was discovered in 1995 at Fermilab.

The ARGUS distribution is named after the experiment. In 2010, the former site of ARGUS at DORISbecame the location of the OLYMPUS experiment.

External links
 Webpage of ARGUS Fest, a symposium to commemorate the 20th anniversary of the discovery of B-meson oscillations. (Last accessed on Sept. 10, 2007)
Record for ARGUS on INSPIRE-HEP

References

Particle experiments